Irena Sznajder (born 7 January 1977) is a retired Polish sprinter who specialized in the 100 metres.

She finished seventh in 4 x 100 metres relay at the 1999 World Championships, together with teammates Zuzanna Radecka, Monika Borejza and Joanna Balcerczak.

Her personal best time is 11.54 seconds, achieved in July 1999 in Kraków.

References

1977 births
Living people
Polish female sprinters
Universiade medalists in athletics (track and field)
Place of birth missing (living people)
Universiade silver medalists for Poland
Medalists at the 1999 Summer Universiade